Francesco Chiesa (5 July 1871 in Sagno – 10 June 1973 in Lugano) was an Italian-speaking Swiss poet and short story writer. He was awarded the Grand Prix Schiller Prize in 1928.

Works
 Bisbino, Bellinzona, Tipografia Eredi Carlo Colombi, Bellinzona 1893
 Preludio, Gedichte, F.Fontana, L.Mondaini, Milano 1897
 Lettere dalla repubblica dell'Iperbole, 1899
 La reggia, Baldini e Castoldi, Milano 1904
 Calliope, Sonette, Lugano, Egisto Cagnoni, Società editrice Avanguardia, 1907 (dt. Kalliope, St. Gallen 1959)
 I viali d'oro, Gedichte,  A.F. Formiggini, Modena 1911, 1928
 Istorie e favole, Genova, Formiggini, 1913 (dt. Historien und Legenden, Zürich 1914)
 Blätter unter der Asche in Tagen lodernder Flammen, dt. Zürich 1915
 Poesie e prose, Zürich, Orell Fuessli, 1915
 Versetti, Tipografia Luganese Sanvito,  Lugano 1918
 Fuochi di primavera, Gedichte,  A.F. Formiggini, Roma 1919
 Consolazioni, Gedichte,  N.Zanichelli, Bologna 1921
 Racconti puerili, Erzählungen, Milano, Treves, 1921 (dt. Bubengeschichten, München 1922)
 Tempo di marzo, Erzählung, Milano, Treves, 1925 (dt. Märzenwetter, Zürich 1927)
 L'altarino di stagno e altri racconti, Erzählungen, Milano, Treves, 1926
 Versi,  Direzione della Nuova Antologia, Roma 1926
 Racconti del mio orto, Erzählungen,  Nuova Antologia, Roma 1927
 Villadorna, Roman,  Mondadori, Milano 1928 (dt. Villa dorna, Bern 1941)
 Compagni di viaggio,  A. Mondadori, Milano 1931 (daraus dt. Zwei Novellen: Claudia. Don Achille, Zürich 1941)
 I romanzi che non scriverò,  Nuova Antologia, Roma,1932
 La stellata sera, Gedichte,  Mondadori, Milano 1933
 Scoperte nel mio mondo,  A.Mondadori, Milano 1934
 Voci nella notte,  A.Mondadori, Milano 1935
 Sant'Amarillide, Roman,  A.Mondadori, Milano 1938 (dt. Sankt Amaryllis, Einsiedeln 1939)
 Passeggiate,  A.Mondadori, Milano 1939
 Racconti del passato prossimo, Erzählungen,  Mondadori, Milano 1941 (dt. Schicksal auf schmalen Wegen, Einsiedeln 1943)
 Sei racconti dinanzi al folclore, Erzählungen,  Edizioni svizzere per la gioventù, Zürich 1941
 Io e i miei,  Mondadori, Milano 1944
 Ricordi dell'età minore,  Istituto Editoriale Ticinese, Bellinzona 1948
 mit Valerio Abbondio, Giuseppe Zoppi, Il diradarsi della nebbia, Tipografia luganese, Lugano 1950
 L'artefice malcontento, Gedichte, A. Mondadori, Milano 1950
 La zia Lucrezia, Società editrice internazionale, Torino 1956
 La scatola di pergamena,  Ed. del Cantonetto, Lugano 1960
 Ricordi dell'età minore,  Istituto Editoriale Ticinese, Bellinzona 1963
 Altri racconti, Erzählungen,  Edizioni del Cantonetto, Lugano 1964
 Sonetti di San Silvestro,  Scheiwiller, Milano 1971
 Tempo di marzo,  Cantonetto, Lugano 1971
 Raduno a sera di pagine sparse, Mario Agliati (Hrsg.),  Grassi, Istituto Editoriale Ticinese, Bellinzona 1972
 Tre noci in un cestello,  Giulio Topi, Lugano 1972
 Lettere iperboliche, neue Auflage, Pierre Codiroli (Hrsg.), Armando Dadò, Locarno 1976
 Casi della vita: tre racconti,  Pro Senectute Ticino, Lugano 1990.

References

1871 births
1973 deaths
20th-century Swiss poets
Men centenarians
Swiss centenarians
Swiss short story writers